Lupfen is south German or Austrian for "lifting" may refer to:

 Lupfen (mountain), a mountain in Baden-Württemberg, Germany
Lupfen (State), a feudal state in Baden-Württemberg, Germany
Lupfen (House), a former major Swabian noble house
 Lupfen (card game), a card game involving 'lifting' (lupfen) the trump card.